The Tadmor River is a river of the Tasman Region of New Zealand's South Island. It flows generally north from its sources in the Hope Range to reach the Motueka River three kilometres northwest of Tapawera.

See also
List of rivers of New Zealand

References

Rivers of the Tasman District
Rivers of New Zealand